Dommartin is a commune in the Somme department in Hauts-de-France in northern France.

Geography
Dommartin-Remiencourt station has rail connections to Amiens and Creil.

Population

See also
Communes of the Somme department

References

External links

 Dommartin on the Quid website 

Communes of Somme (department)